Glass v. The Sloop Betsey, 3 U.S. (3 Dall.) 6 (1794), was a United States Supreme Court case in which the Court held that French consuls in the United States cannot hear cases to determine the property rights of foreign ships captured by French vessels and brought into American ports. In this case Glass was an American shareholder in a captured Swedish vessel and sued to determine his rights in District Court.  The Supreme Court determined that the District Courts of the United States have the exclusive right to hear admiralty cases.

Subsequent developments 
After this opinion, Chief Justice John Jay received praise for his decision and was sent to Europe to negotiate a treaty regarding admiralty rights.  Upon his return, he was elected Governor of New York and left the high court.

References

External links
 

United States Supreme Court cases
United States Supreme Court cases of the Jay Court
United States admiralty case law
1794 in United States case law